Sclerophasma is a genus of insects in the family Mantophasmatidae. It is a monotypic genus consisting of the species Sclerophasma paresisense.

Sclerophasma paresisense is endemic to Namibia, where it is only known from the Paresisberge.

References

Mantophasmatidae
Monotypic insect genera
Insects of Namibia
Endemic fauna of Namibia